Kevin Hogan (7 December 1932 – 10 August 2001) was an  Australian rules footballer who played with Richmond in the Victorian Football League (VFL).

Hogan coached Airport West Football Club in 1955.

Notes

External links 

Kevin Hogan's Profile @Tigerland Archive

1932 births
2001 deaths
Australian rules footballers from Victoria (Australia)
Richmond Football Club players